William Barnard may refer to:

William Barnard (bishop) (1697–1768), Anglican bishop of Raphoe and Derry
William Barnard (engraver) (1774–1849), English mezzotint engraver
William O. Barnard (1852–1939), U.S. Representative from Indiana
Bill Barnard (1886–1958), New Zealand lawyer and politician
William Stebbins Barnard (1849–1887), American biologist